Chang Wei-chen (3 June 1898 – March 1997) was a Chinese politician. She was among the first group of women elected to the Legislative Yuan in 1948.

Biography
Born in 1898 and originally from Jiangsu province, Chang graduated from the department of political science at the University of Shanghai. She then attended the University of Michigan in the United States on a Levi Barbour Oriental Girls' Scholarship, graduating with an MA in 1927. She married Luo Jialun, a politician and diplomat.

In the 1948 elections for the Legislative Yuan, Chang was a candidate in Jiangsu province and was elected to parliament. She subsequently sat on the Economic and Resources Committee and the Legal Committee, and was the convener of the Foreign Affairs Committee. She resigned from the Legislative Yuan in 1951.

References

1898 births
University of Shanghai alumni
University of Michigan alumni
20th-century Chinese women politicians
Members of the 1st Legislative Yuan
Members of the 1st Legislative Yuan in Taiwan
1997 deaths